Local government in Dublin, the capital city of Ireland, is currently administered through the local authorities of four local government areas (the city of Dublin and the counties of Dún Laoghaire–Rathdown, Fingal and South Dublin). The historical development of these councils dates back to medieval times.

Poor laws
Under the Poor Relief (Ireland) Act 1838, counties were divided into poor law unions, which were in turn composed of poor law electoral division.

Municipal Corporations (Ireland) Act 1840
The Municipal Corporations (Ireland) Act 1840 reduced the number of boroughs in Ireland and reformed the governance of those that remained. Dublin was one of ten boroughs to retain a corporation.

The assembly of Dublin Corporation was Dublin City Council of sixty members. The city was divided into fifteen wards, each ward to have one alderman and three councillors. The wards were revised by order under the Dublin Corporation Act 1849 (12 & 13 Vict., c. 85), and by further Act, the Corporation of Dublin Act 1850 (13 & 14 Vict., c. 50), were designated to correspond to former wards for the purpose of designating aldermen.

Townships
Urban areas in county Dublin formed townships governed by town commissioners over the course of the nineteenth century, either under the Towns Improvement (Ireland) Act 1854 or by local acts:
Balbriggan
Blackrock (1863)
Clontarf (1869)
Dalkey
Drumcondra, Clonliffe and Glasnevin (1878)
Killiney and Ballybrack
Kingstown
New Kilmainham
Pembroke (1863)
Rathmines (1847); later expanded as Rathmines and Rathgar (1862)

Local Government (Ireland) Act 1898
The Local Government (Ireland) Act 1898 reformed local government throughout the country, with first-tier division between administrative counties and county boroughs, and a second-tier division of administrative counties into urban areas and rural areas. The poor law electoral divisions within counties were renamed as district electoral divisions.

The city of Dublin continued as a county borough. Each of the townships in the administrative county of Dublin, with the exception of Balbriggan, became an urban district. The rural areas were Balrothery, Celbridge No. 2, North Dublin, Rathdown, and South Dublin.

1900: expansion of city
In reorganisation shortly after the implementation of the 1898 Act, the urban districts of Clontarf, of Drumcondra, Clonliffe and Glasnevin, and of New Kilmainham were incorporated into the city. The added area became the wards of Clontarf East, Clontarf West, Drumcondra, Glasnevin, and New Kilmainham, each elected one alderman and three councillors (with a further portion added to the South Dock Ward). This was an expansion of the number of members of the City Council from sixty to eighty. An election was held for the new wards in January 1901.

Establishment of Howth
Howth became an urban district in 1919, having formerly been within the rural district of North Dublin.

Local Government (Ireland) Act 1919
The Local Government (Ireland) Act 1919 introduced the system of proportional representation by means of the single transferable vote to Irish local elections. This ended the use of wards in the city and district electoral divisions in the county as electoral areas. However, they continued to be used and defined as fundamental geographical units, both to define the borough electoral areas and county electoral areas, and as census tracts.

Local Government (Dublin) Act 1930
The administration of the both the city and county of Dublin was altered by the Local Government (Dublin) Act 1930:
 the abolition of the urban districts of Pembroke and Rathmines and Rathgar and their inclusion within the city limits;
 the abolition of urban districts of Dún Laoghaire, Blackrock, Dalkey, Killiney and Ballybrack, and the creation as their successor of the borough of Dún Laoghaire;
 the transfer, from 1 April 1931, of territory from the county to the city, termed the "added rural areas", including Drumcondra, Glasnevin, Donnybrook and Terenure;
 the abolition of rural districts in County Dublin (which had been abolished elsewhere under the Local Government Act 1925;
 the reduction of Dublin City Council from 80 members to 35 members, 5 of which were to be elected by a register of commercial electors.

The register of commercial electors was provided by separate legislation. These five seats were abolished in 1935 and redistributed as geographical seats.

1940s: expansion of city
In 1942, Howth was transferred from the county to the city.

In 1945, the city council was increased from 35 to 45 members.

1985: organisation into electoral counties
Under Local Government (Reorganisation) Act 1985, territory was transferred from the county to the city (including Santry and Phoenix Park), and from the city to the county (including Howth, Sutton and parts of Kilbarrack including Bayside).

Dublin City Council was increased from 45 to 52 members.

County Dublin was divided into three electoral counties, each with its own council: Dublin–Fingal (24 members), Dublin–Belgard (26 members), and Dún Laoghaire–Rathdown (28 members). Elections were to be administered through these electoral counties, rather than to the County Council or the Borough Council of Dún Laoghaire. At the 1985 election, the County Council would consist of 78 members, being the total number of members from the three electoral counties. This was an increase from 36 at the 1979 election. Areas of Dún Laoghaire–Rathdown were to be designated as relevant electoral areas, whose members would also sit as members of Corporation of Dún Laoghaire. 

At the 1991 local election, the electoral counties of Dublin–Belgard and Dublin–Fingal were renamed as South Dublin and Fingal respectively.

1994: Division of County Dublin
Under the Local Government (Dublin) Act 1993, County Dublin and the borough of Dún Laoghaire were abolished. The county was succeeded by the three new counties of Dún Laoghaire–Rathdown, Fingal, and South Dublin, corresponding, with minor boundary changes, with the electoral counties. This took effect on 1 January 1994.

21st century
The Local Government Act 2001, which came into effect in 2002, altered the nomenclature of local government areas throughout the state. The county boroughs were renamed as cities, while administrative counties were to be described simply as counties. Dublin Corporation became Dublin City Council, previously the name for the assembly alone. The town commissioners of Balbriggan became a town council.

Under the Local Government Reform Act 2014, local government in Ireland was reduced to a single tier. In Dublin, that meant the abolition of Balbriggan Town Council. There was a adjustment to the number of seats for each local authority, which saw an increase for all four of the Dublin authorities. Dublin City Council was increased to 63, while the councils of each of Dún Laoghaire–Rathdown, Fingal, and South Dublin were each increased to 40.

The 2014 Act allowed for a plebiscite to be held to on whether there should be a directly elected mayor for Dublin city and county. However, it required the approval of the councils of the counties and the city. It was rejected by Fingal County Council, but supported by each of the three other Dublin councils.

Regional administration
Eight Regional Authorities were established in Ireland in 1994. This included the Dublin Regional Authority, and comprised 14 representatives of the corporation of the county borough of Dublin, and five each from the councils of the administrative counties of Dún Laoghaire–Rathdown, Fingal and South Dublin.

In 2014, the regional authorities were abolished, and their administration transferred to Regional Assemblies. From 1 January 2015, these councils were part of the Eastern and Midland Regional Assembly; this included 7 representatives of the council of the city of Dublin, and three each from the councils of the counties of Dún Laoghaire–Rathdown, Fingal and South Dublin (as well as other counties in the region). These four form the Dublin strategic planning area within the region.

Proposed reform
There was a Dublin citizens assembly in 2022 to consider reform of local government, including a directly elected mayor.

Definitions of wards and DEDs
Under the Electoral Act 1963, the Minister for Local Government had the authority to divide a county borough into wards and a county into district electoral districts, with previous divisions remaining in place prior to the first such order. Wards and DEDs were used to define components of electoral geography (local electoral areas and Dáil constituencies) and as census tracts. From 1996, they were both renamed as electoral divisions.

Definitions of wards
15 April 1971: Revised wards in the county borough of Dublin
12 April 1986: Revised wards in the county borough of Dublin
29 April 1994: Amendments to wards to account for alterations to county boundary
15 February 1997: Cherry Orchard B renamed as Carna

Definitions of district electoral divisions
15 April 1971: Revised district electoral divisions in the County Dublin
12 April 1986: Revised district electoral divisions in the County Dublin
24 March 1986: minor correction
29 April 1994: amendment following establishment of new counties

References, citations and sources

References

Further reading

External links
 Dublin Historic Maps, Boundaries & an OSM Miscellany

Local government in the Republic of Ireland
County Dublin